Suhasini Chattopadhyay (also known as Suhasini Nambiar; 1902–26 November 1973) was an Indian communist leader and a freedom fighter. She was the first woman member of the Communist Party of India.

Biography 

Suhasini was one of eight children of Aghore Nath Chattopadhyay and Barada Sundari Debi. She was the sister of well known freedom fighter and Indian National Congress President Sarojini Naidu.

In 1920, she married freedom fighter, journalist A. C. N. Nambiar in Madras when she was just 17. They separated soon due to Nambiar's affair with his secretary, Eva Geissler. After they separated, both resided in London for some time till Suhasini finished her studies at Oxford. Both of them shifted to Berlin. There she joined her nephew Jayasurya, son of Sarojini Naidu, who was studying medicine there. Both of them became employed there, Jayasurya editing periodicals and Suhasini teaching English to Germans.

Influenced by her brother Virendranath Chattopadhyay, better known as Chatto, she became a communist. Her brother then aided in her admission to the Eastern University in Moscow with the help of M.N. Roy. She returned to India with the famed British communist Lester Hutchinson in 1928. Hutchinson was even arrested in the Meerut conspiracy case.

After completing her Moscow stay, she came back to India. She kept in touch with her husband Nambiar, asking him to return to India, but he rejected the idea due to his new relationship. His mistress Eva was the sister of M.N. Roy's lover, Louise Geissler. Suhasini waited for Nambiar's return for six years. In 1938 she married R.M. Jambhekar, a trade union activist and founder of ISCUS. They had met in Moscow. When American journalist Edgar Snow came to India in 1931, it was Suhasini who took him around. He wrote in a later article, "The Revolt of India's Women", that Suhasini was the most beautiful woman he had ever seen.

Stint with CPI
Suhasini joined the Communist Party of India in 1929 as its first woman member. Strangely she was under police surveillance until after independence in 1951. A fine singer and dancer, she soon became involved in the cultural activities of the party. She shifted base to Bombay permanently and became a known face among the communist movement. She later helped establish the Little Ballet Group and was active in IPTA. Under her leadership, they staged plays which were well received by the public. She also started publishing The New Spark for the communist party.

In 1941 the party entrusted Suhasini and other senior leaders of Bengal like Bhupendra Nath Dutta, Hiren Mukherjee and S.K. Acharya with establishing Friends of Soviet Union (FSU). This was on the day of Nazi German aggression on the USSR, during second World War. After his release from the Nasik prison in 1942, Ramakrishna Jambhekar also began to help Suhasini with FSU work. Another communist Shashi Bakaya also joined FSU. He had left Ferguson College, Poona at the call of Gandhi and had joined Sabarmati Ashram. The first All India conference of FSU was held in Bombay in 1944. Sarojini Naidu was elected chairperson and Jambhekar general secretary. Suhasini had actively helped to organize this conference.

In March 1947, the first South Asian Relations Conference was held in New Delhi. At the initiative of Nehru, both Suhasini and Jambhekar were involved in this conference. Sarojini Naidu again presided over the conference and Mahatma Gandhi addressed it.

In the initial years, Nehru helped both Suhasini and her husband to get acquainted with Marxism. Suhasini was very close to Bakaya and Dang families of Lahore and Amritsar respectively. She kept in close touch with Vimla Bakaya, Ravi Bakaya and Satyapal Dang etc. She used to visit Lahore and stay with her sister Mrinalini, who was the Principal of Ganga Ram
School. Both the sisters used to teach 'The
Internationale' in their circle.

Helping Amir Hyder Khan 
Around 32 communist and trade union leaders from all over India were arrested in the Meerut Conspiracy Case of 1929 - for organising a railway strike. Budding communist leader Amir Haider Khan's name was also in the list of those charged by the British but he escaped the dragnet. He had just returned from abroad and was staying at Suhasini's place with Rizvi. He had met Dange, Ghate, Adhikari and others. It was Suhasini who told Khan that it was dangerous to stay in Bombay, suggesting he should go to Goa. Amir Haider had an Italian passport, with which he shifted to Goa, then a Portuguese colony, and then left for Naples on way to Germany. Suhasini helped him greatly in this escape.

When Amir Hyder returned to India in 1931, he had to leave for Madras on party's instructions, as it was not safe in Bombay. Suhasini helped him again and arranged money. She also arranged his stay in Madras. When he was arrested there, Party again sent Suhasini, her sister and Ranadive to organize his defence. After release from Meerut, Ghate and Mirajkar met Suhasini and Haider regarding further work. In the meantime party decided to work within the Congress too for Indian independence.She even helped Haider to attend the Ramgarh session of Congress in 1940.

Later Political Life 
Suhasini was in politics till the late 1950s. She also joined the Congress party briefly but could not accept the new style of politics that emerged in the 1960s and gradually withdrew. She continued to be involved in social work, mainly with her NGO, New Work Centre for Women, till the very end.

Around late 60s her health deteriorated and she required the use of a wheelchair. She died unsung in 1973 in Bombay.

References 

Indian communists
Communist Party of India politicians from West Bengal
Female politicians of the Communist Party of India
Articles created or expanded during Women's History Month (India) - 2015
Azad Hind
1902 births
1974 deaths